Sweden held a general election throughout September 1921.

Results

Regional results

Percentage share

By votes

Constituency results

Percentage share

By votes

Results by city and district

Since the Communists and the Social Democratic Left did not run against each other in many constituencies, their results were listed together in the official statistics and thus inseparable at a district and city level when not in one-city constituencies (Gothenburg and Stockholm). As a result, they have been listed under "K/V" (Swedish for Communist-Left) in the results.

The Communists stood alone for the left in Bohuslän, Gothenburg, the two Malmöhus constituencies, Stockholm County, Södermanland, Värmland, Örebro and Östergötland County.

The Socialist Left stood alone for the left in Blekinge, Jönköping, Kristianstad, Kronoberg, Västerbotten and both Älvsborg constituencies.

In the remaining constituencies either both or none stood.

The Farmers' League did not contest the three major cities.

Blekinge

Gothenburg and Bohuslän

Bohuslän

Gothenburg

Gotland

Gävleborg

Halland

Jämtland

Jönköping

Kalmar

Kopparberg

Kristianstad

Kronoberg

Malmöhus

Malmö area

Malmöhus County

Norrbotten

Skaraborg

Stockholm

Stockholm (city)

Stockholm County

Södermanland

Uppsala

Värmland

Västerbotten

Västernorrland

Västmanland
The three left-wing parties were running under a joint list in the constituency. Parties' reports at an overall constituency level were reported separately to denote MP distribution.

Älvsborg

Älvsborg N

Älvsborg S

Örebro

Östergötland

References

General elections in Sweden